Judd Dillon Davis (born c. 1973) is an American former football player who was the 1993 recipient of the Lou Groza Award recognizing the best placekicker in college football.

Davis grew up in Ocala, Florida.  He attended Forest High School in Ocala, and played high school football for the Forest Wildcats as both punter and placekicker.  During his high school senior season, he completed seven of eight field goals attempts, with a long of 49 yards, and averaged over 40 yards per punt.

Davis attended the University of Florida in Gainesville, Florida, where he played for coach Steve Spurrier's Florida Gators football team from 1991 to 1994.  He was initially a walk-on player and saw no game action until his 1992 sophomore season.  During his 1993 junior season, he completed fifteen of nineteen (78.95%) field goal attempts, and forty-seven of forty-nine (95.92%) extra point attempts.  Memorably, he completed four of four attempted field goals and three of three extra point attempts, and providing the Gators' winning margin in their 33–26 victory over the Georgia Bulldogs in wet field conditions.  In addition to winning the Lou Groza Award in 1993, Davis received first-team All-American honors from United Press International and third-team honors from the Associated Press.  He received first-team All-Southeastern Conference (SEC) honors as a senior in 1994.

During his three-season college career, Davis set or tied eight school records and three SEC records.  In 1994, he surpassed former Gators running back Emmitt Smith to become the Gators' all-time leading scorer with 225 career points.  Including bowl games, Davis completed nearly 87 percent of his field goal attempts (33 of 38) inside of 50 yards.  He completed two of four attempts greater than 50 yards, including a career long of 52 year against the Ole Miss Rebels in 1994.  On point-after-touchdown attempts, he completed 129 of 131 extra points, a new team record.

Davis graduated from Florida with a bachelor's degree in American studies in 1995.  He was inducted into the University of Florida Athletic Hall of Fame as a "Gator Great" in 2011. He now lives in Ocala, Florida and has two children, Connor and Maggie Davis.

Career accomplishments 

Won the 1993 Lou Groza Award given annually to the top kicker in nation
Set or tied (8) school records and (3) SEC records
First Team All-American in 1993
Tied the SEC single-season record for points by a kicker (107)
Broke the all-time SEC record for PATs made in a season (65) and made a school record (81) consecutive PAT attempts
Upon graduation was UF's all-time leading scorer (225)
Inducted into the UF Athletic Hall of Fame in 2011
Signed with the Seattle Seahawks in 1995

See also 

 Florida Gators
 Florida Gators football, 1990–99
 List of Florida Gators football All-Americans
 List of University of Florida alumni
 List of University of Florida Athletic Hall of Fame members

References 

1973 births
Living people
All-American college football players
American football placekickers
Florida Gators football players
Ocala High School alumni
Players of American football from Florida
Sportspeople from Ocala, Florida